Artur Burger (6 June 1943 – 23 September 2000) was an Austrian pharmacist and pharmacognosist. He taught pharmacognosy at the University of Innsbruck and published more than 100 papers on polymorphism in drugs.

References

1943 births
2000 deaths
Pharmacognosists
Austrian pharmacists